The Galkynysh Gas Field, formerly known as Iolotan gas field or South Yolotan – Osman field, is a large natural gas field near Ýolöten in Mary Province of Turkmenistan. It is the world's second-largest gas field.

History
The discovery of the gas field was announced on 2 November 2006. Late Turkmen president Saparmurat Niyazov invited Chinese CNPC and Turkish Çalik Enerji to participate in the exploration and development of the Ýolöten field. In 2008, the gas field was audited by Gaffney, Cline & Associates. According to Gaffney, Cline and Associates (GCA), Galkynysh is five times larger than the Dauletabad gas field and fourth- or fifth-largest gas field in the world.

In December 2009, the contracts to develop the field were awarded to CNPC, Hyundai Engineering and Petrofac.

In November 2011, the field was renamed as Galkynysh. Production started in September 2013.

Description
Galkynysh consist of Iolotan, Minara, Osman and Yashlar fields. Other nearby gas areas are Gunorta Garakel, Garakel, Giurgiu, Gazanly, Gundogar Eloten and Gunbatar Yandakly.

Oil reserves are 300 million tons. The crude oil extracted at Galkynysh is transported to the Seýdi Oil Refinery.

Development
The field is developed by Türkmengaz. CNPC, Hyundai Engineering and Petrofac built gas processing plants.

References

Natural gas fields in Turkmenistan
Energy in Central Asia